The 2007 season of the Enterprise Football League, also known as Fubon Enterprise Football League, consisted of four teams who play each other team twice. It was co-sponsored by Fubon Financial Holding Co. and Taiwan Cement Corporation. Taiwan Power Company F.C. won the league title and would represent Chinese Taipei to compete in AFC President's Cup 2008.

League format
The league consisted of two rounds, with each team playing each other team once per round for a total of twelve games. The order in which teams played in the first round was chosen at random, while the order in the second round was determined by the position of the league on the league table.

The first round was played in January 2007 and the second round was played in March 2007. There was a break in February so that players in the Chinese Taipei national Olympic football team could prepare for the 2008 Summer Olympic qualifiers.

League table

Results

First round

Second round

Season goalscorers

4 goals

3 goals

2 goals

1 goal

References

Top level Taiwanese football league seasons
Enterprise Football League seasons
Chinese Taipei
1